The Ectenes or Hectenes were, in Greek mythology, the autochthones or earliest inhabitants of Boeotia, where the city of Thebes would later be founded. 

According to Pausanias, writing from his travels in Boeotia in the 2nd century CE, "The first to occupy the land of Thebes are said to have been the Ectenes, whose king was Ogygus, an aboriginal."

Notes 

Ancient tribes in Boeotia

References 

 Pausanias, Description of Greece with an English Translation by W.H.S. Jones, Litt.D., and H.A. Ormerod, M.A., in 4 Volumes. Cambridge, MA, Harvard University Press; London, William Heinemann Ltd. 1918. . Online version at the Perseus Digital Library
 Pausanias, Graeciae Descriptio. 3 vols. Leipzig, Teubner. 1903.  Greek text available at the Perseus Digital Library.

Autochthons of classical mythology
Characters in Greek mythology